Pieris naganum, the Naga white, is a small butterfly of the family Pieridae, that is, the yellows and whites, which is found in Assam and the Naga Hills in India and in Upper Myanmar.

Description

The upperside of the male is white with the costa of the forewing irrorated (speckled) with black scales up to two-thirds of its length from the base, and also at the apex and the termen to vein 3. Discocellulars with a crescent-shaped black mark; a large elongate black spot in the middle of the interspace 3 produced outwards and joining with the black on the termen.

Hindwing uniform. The underside of the forewing white with the apex creamy white. Underside of the hindwing also ochraceous white.

Antennae black, speckled with white; head, thorax and abdomen above black and beneath white.

The wingspan is about 54 mm.

See also
List of butterflies of India
List of butterflies of India (Pieridae)

References

naganum
Butterflies described in 1884
Butterflies of Asia
Taxa named by Frederic Moore